James Lee Paterson (born 25 September 1979) is a Scottish former professional footballer who played as a left back or left midfielder. He was most recently the interim manager of East Kilbride.

He played for Dundee United, Motherwell, Plymouth Argyle, Aberdeen, Shamrock Rovers, Bristol Rovers, Celtic Nation, Forfar Athletic and Dunfermline Athletic. He is a former Scotland under-21 internationalist, making nine appearances between 1997 and 2001.

Career

Scotland
Paterson began his career at Dundee United. During his time at United he was unfortunate to break his leg twice in as many years. He left Dundee United in June 2004, agreeing to end his contract a year early.

On 14 July 2004, Paterson signed for Motherwell. He scored his first goal for the club on 24 August 2004, as Motherwell won 3–0 against Greenock Morton in the Scottish League Cup.

On 1 June 2006, Paterson signed a new two-year contract at Motherwell.

England & Ireland
On 31 January 2008, Paterson moved to Plymouth Argyle on a three and a half-year deal for an undisclosed fee, thought to be around £250,000. He scored his first goal for Pilgrims with an effort from the edge of the box against Southampton on 19 February.

On 1 February 2010, he signed for Aberdeen on loan until the end of the 2009–10 season. On 31 March 2010 Paterson returned to Plymouth Argyle as injury ended his season at Aberdeen.

On 12 August 2010, it was announced that Paterson had been allowed to travel to Greece to negotiate a deal to join Kavala who play in the Greek Premier Division. Paterson, although praised for his professionalism by new Argyle manager Peter Reid, was deemed surplus to requirements at Home Park and has been allowed to leave if he can get a deal. This deal fell through, however, and Paterson again returned to Plymouth.

Released by Plymouth at the end of the season, Paterson sought out other clubs and went on trial with Yeovil in July 2011.

On 31 August 2011, Paterson signed for League of Ireland champions Shamrock Rovers. Paterson made his debut on 3 September in a 2–1 away victory against Dundalk and helped the club win the 2011 League of Ireland championship. He also played in the UEFA Europa League group stage for Rovers. Paterson left Rovers at the end of season and went on trial with St Johnstone in January 2012.

At the end of January 2012, Paterson signed a short-term contract with Bristol Rovers until the end of the season. Having been a regular for Rovers during the season run in, Paterson agreed a new one-year deal, with the option of a further year.

On 9 January 2014, Paterson signed for Northern League Division One club Celtic Nation on loan until the end of the 2013–14 season.

In May 2014, following Bristol Rovers relegation to the Conference Premier, Paterson was one of twelve players released by the club.

Return to Scotland
On 2 September 2014, Paterson signed for Scottish League One club Forfar Athletic, signing a contract until January 2015.

On 6 January 2015, Paterson signed for Scottish League One club Dunfermline Athletic F.C. until the end of the season in a role that would also see him coaching The Pars under 20's team, alongside Andrew Barrowman. After making six appearances for Dunfermline, Paterson was released by the club at the end of the season. After being a free agent for five months, Paterson signed a short-term contract with Stenhousemuir in October 2015, making his first appearance in a league match against Cowdenbeath. After two years with the side, Paterson retired from football at the end of the 2016–17 season.

Career statistics
As of 1 February 2012

Honours
Shamrock Rovers
League of Ireland: 2011

References

External links

Living people
1979 births
Footballers from Bellshill
Association football fullbacks
Scottish footballers
Scotland under-21 international footballers
Dundee United F.C. players
Motherwell F.C. players
Plymouth Argyle F.C. players
Aberdeen F.C. players
Scottish Premier League players
English Football League players
Shamrock Rovers F.C. players
League of Ireland players
Bristol Rovers F.C. players
Celtic Nation F.C. players
Forfar Athletic F.C. players
Dunfermline Athletic F.C. players
Stenhousemuir F.C. players
Scottish Professional Football League players